Susan Gardiner (born April 13, 1980 in North Vancouver, British Columbia) is a Canadian water polo player.

Gardiner is a former student at the University of British Columbia. She was a member of the Canadian team at the 2004 Summer Olympics, the 2000 Summer Olympics and the bronze medal-winning team at 2001 World Aquatics Championships in Fukuoka, Japan.

Gardiner is an alumnus and past coach of the Vancouver-based Pacific Storm Water Polo Club.

See also
 Canada women's Olympic water polo team records and statistics
 List of World Aquatics Championships medalists in water polo

References

External links
 

Canadian female water polo players
Water polo players at the 2000 Summer Olympics
Water polo players at the 2004 Summer Olympics
Olympic water polo players of Canada
Sportspeople from North Vancouver
1980 births
Living people
World Aquatics Championships medalists in water polo
Pan American Games silver medalists for Canada
Pan American Games medalists in water polo
Water polo players at the 2003 Pan American Games
Medalists at the 2003 Pan American Games